The Elysian Fields, also called Elysium, are the final resting place of the souls of the heroic and the virtuous in Greek mythology and religion.

Elysian Fields may also refer to:

Places 
 Elysian Fields, Hoboken, New Jersey, site of the first organized baseball game
 Elysian Fields, Mississippi
 Elysian Fields, Texas
 Avenue of the Elysian Fields, Champs-Élysées, major thoroughfare in Paris
 Elysian Fields Avenue, New Orleans, a setting and a symbolic element in A Streetcar Named Desire

Art, entertainment and media

Music

Albums
 Beyond Elysian Fields (2004), an album by Hugh Cornwell (formerly the Stranglers)

Songs
 "Elysian Fields", a song by the band Megadeth, from Youthanasia
 "Elysian Fields", a song by Andy Moor and Carrie Skipper
 "Elysian Fields", a song by Suicideboys
 "Elysian Fields", a song by God Is An Astronaut from the album A Moment of Stillness
 "The Garden of Elysian", a song by Local Natives from the album Violet Street

Other music
 Elysian Fields, an American art rock band
  Elysian Fields, a music festival held the first weekend of August in Boyce, Virginia

Other art, entertainment and media
 Elysian Fields, the destination of Blanche Dubois in the 1947 play A Streetcar Named Desire by Tennessee Williams
 Elysian Fields, a fictitious secret society in the television series House of Cards
 Elysian Fields Quarterly, a periodical
 The Man from Elysian Fields (2001), a movie starring Andy Garcia
 The House That Jack Built (2018), a movie starring Matt Dillon
 Elysium (film), a 2013 movie starring Matt Damon.
 Elysian Fields is the name of a nightclub/roadhouse at the end of a pier in the Mississippi delta, in the film Beasts of the Southern Wild (2012).
 In the 2011 video game L.A. Noire, Elysian Fields is the name of a development company which plays a major role in the plot of the game.

See also 
 Elysian (disambiguation)